Señor and the Queen is an EP by the Gaslight Anthem. It consists of 4 songs and was released in early 2008 by Sabot Productions. It was released simultaneously on vinyl, with the double-7" white (100 copies) and double-7" red editions (500 copies) being the most sought-after.

Reception

Absolutepunk.net, who were very receptive to their debut album Sink or Swim welcomed the release of this EP.  "The first half of Señor and the Queen features the standard catchy and fast Gaslight Anthem song. Things really start to get interesting when track three, "Say I Won’t (Recognize)," rolls around."  They were very impressed by the use of tempo changes in that song and equally impressed with the band's signs of musical versatility in the slow ballad "Blue Jeans and White T-Shirts." Punknews.org also liked the EP, saying "For now, Señor and the Queen should more than tide anyone over in addition to introducing the band to countless more fans. "  They called "Wherefore Art Thou, Elvis?" the catchiest song on the EP and noted guitarist Alex Rosamilia's guitar skills on "Say I Won't (Recognize)."  Fallon's impressive songwriting also drew further comparisons to Bruce Springsteen.

Track listing

Personnel
Band
 Brian Fallon – lead vocals, guitar, producer
 Alex Rosamilia – guitar, backing vocals, producer
 Alex Levine – bass guitar, backing vocals, producer
 Benny Horowitz – drums, percussion, backing vocals, producer

Additional vocalists
 Jet Mullen – additional vocals on "Blue Jeans & White T-Shirts"

Production
 Mike Vasquez – recording engineer, assistant producer
 Che Arthur – assistant producer
 Derron Nuhfer – audio mastering
 Jesse Menn – band photo
 Kenny Colvin – design

References

External links
punknews.org review
Sobriquet Magazine review of the EP
Aversion.com review of the EP

The Gaslight Anthem albums
2008 debut EPs